Martina Růžičková (born 22 March 1980) is a Czech former racing cyclist. She competed in the women's road race at the 2004 Summer Olympics, in the 2012 UCI women's road race in Valkenburg aan de Geul and in the 2013 UCI women's road race in Florence.

Major results
Source: 

2004
 1st  Road race, National Road Championships
2006
 National Road Championships
2nd Time trial
3rd Road race
2007
 National Road Championships
1st  Road race
2nd Time trial
 4th Overall Gracia–Orlová
2008
 National Road Championships
1st  Road race
2nd Time trial
 3rd Individual pursuit, International Track Challenge Vienna
 7th Overall Gracia–Orlová
2009
 National Road Championships
1st  Road race
2nd Time trial
 International Track Challenge Vienna
1st Individual pursuit
3rd Points race
3rd Scratch
 3rd Overall Tour de Feminin-O cenu Českého Švýcarska
 10th Memorial Davide Fardelli
2010
 National Road Championships
2nd Road race
2nd Time trial
 6th Memorial Davide Fardelli
2011
 National Road Championships
2nd Road race
2nd Time trial
2012
 2nd Road race, National Road Championships
 7th Overall Tour de Bretagne Féminin
2013
 3rd Grand Prix el Salvador
2015
 1st Scratch, Six Days of Bremen
 3rd Time trial, National Road Championships

References

External links
 

1980 births
Living people
Czech female cyclists
Cyclists at the 2004 Summer Olympics
Olympic cyclists of the Czech Republic
People from Roudnice nad Labem
Sportspeople from the Ústí nad Labem Region